Millom Without is a civil parish in the Borough of Copeland, Cumbria, England. It contains ten listed buildings that are recorded in the National Heritage List for England. Of these, one is listed at Grade II*, the middle of the three grades, and the others are at Grade II, the lowest grade. The parish is to the north of the town of Millom in the valley of the River Duddon. It is now almost completely rural, but in the past has been the site of industry, including iron smelting fired by charcoal. There are remains of this industry in form of the ruins of a blast furnace and barns for storing charcoal, both of which are listed. The parish also contains a disused cornmill and sawmill. The other listed buildings are houses and associated structures, two bridges, a former limekiln, and a church.


Key

Buildings

References

Citations

Sources

Lists of listed buildings in Cumbria